Gromkiy ("Loud") was a Project 1135M Burevestnik-class ("Petrel") Guard Ship (SKR) or 'Krivak II'-class frigate that served with the Soviet and Russian Navies. Launched on 11 April 1978, the vessel operated as part of the Northern Fleet as an anti-submarine vessel, with an armament built around the URPK-5 Rastrub (SS-N-14 'Silex') missile system. In 1991, the ship took part in the semicentennial commemoration of the first of the arctic convoys of the Second World War alongside the Royal Navy frigate . Soon afterwards, the ship was transferred to the Russian Navy following the dissolution of the Soviet Union. Gromkiy served for less than two years in this new role before being withdrawn for repairs and, ultimately, decommissioning on 16 March 1998.

Design and development
Gromkiy was one of eleven Project 1135M ships launched between 1975 and 1981. Project 1135, the Burevestnik ("Petrel") class, was envisaged by the Soviet Navy as a less expensive complement to the Project 1134A Berkut A (NATO reporting name 'Kresta II') and Project 1134B Berkut B (NATO reporting name 'Kara') classes of anti-submarine ships. Project 1135M was an improvement developed in 1972 with slightly increased displacement and heavier guns compared with the basic 1135. The design, by N. P. Sobolov, combined a powerful missile armament with good seakeeping for a blue water role. The ships were designated Guard Ship (SKR) to reflect their substantial greater anti-ship capability than the earlier members of the class and the Soviet strategy of creating protected areas for friendly submarines close to the coast. NATO forces called the vessels 'Krivak II'-class frigates.

Power was provided by two M7K power sets, each consisting of a combination of a  DK59 and a  M62 gas turbine arranged in a COGAG installation and driving one fixed-pitch propeller. The ship’s complement was 194, including 23 officers.

Armament and sensors
Gromkiy was designed for anti-submarine warfare around the URPK-5 Rastrub (NATO reporting name SS-N-14 'Silex') system, backed up by a pair of quadruple launchers for  torpedoes and a pair of RBU-6000  Smerch-2 anti-submarine rocket launchers. The URPK-5 and the torpedoes also had anti-ship capabilities, the former through the use of four 85RU dual-purpose missiles mounted in KT-100U launchers. Defence against aircraft was provided by forty 4K33 OSA-M (SA-N-4 'Gecko') surface to air missiles which were launched from two sets of ZIF-122 launchers, each capable of launching two missiles. Two  AK-100 guns were mounted aft.

The ship had a well-equipped sensor suite, including a single MR-310A Angara-A air/surface search radar, Don navigation radar, the MP-401S Start-S ESM radar system and the Spectrum-F laser warning system. Fire control for the guns consisted of a MR-143 Lev-214 radar. An extensive sonar complex was fitted, including MG-332T Titan-2T, which was mounted in a bow radome, and MG-325 Vega. The vessel was also equipped with the PK-16 decoy-dispenser system which used chaff as a form of missile defense.

Construction and career
Laid down by on 23 June 1976 with the yard number 164 at the Yantar Shipyard in Kaliningrad, Gromkiy was launched on 11 April 1978.  The ship was the sixth of the class built at the yard and was named for a Russian word that can be translated as loud. The vessel was commissioned on 30 September and joined the Northern Fleet at Murmansk.

On 26 August 1991, the vessel left Murmansk to lead a flotilla of ships out in commemoration of the arctic convoys of the Second World War. The Soviets rendezvoused with the Royal Navy frigate  and undertook the joint exercise Dervish 91, which simulated the attacks by German forces, and then sailed to Nordkapp where commemorative activities took place. The fleet then sailed to Murmansk on 29 August and on to Arkhangelsk, arriving on 31 August, fifty years after the first British vessel arrived in the first wartime convoy, Operation Dervish. Commemorations were held involving citizens from Australia, Canada, Great Britain, New Zealand, the Soviet Union and the United States, representing the allies that were involved in the original operation. The event was nearly marred by the 1991 Soviet coup d'état attempt, which almost led to the cancellation of the exercise.

With the dissolution of the Soviet Union on 26 December 1991, Gromkiy was transferred to the Russian Navy. On 6 April 1993, the vessel arrived at  Shipyard Number 35 and then on 27 December 1994, at Shipyard Number 10, to be repaired. However, lack of funding meant that instead the ship was decommissioned on 16 March 1998 and broken up at Murmansk.

References

Citations

Bibliography

 
 
 
 
 
 
 
 
 
 

1978 ships
Cold War frigates of the Soviet Union
Krivak-class frigates
Ships built at Yantar Shipyard
Ships built in the Soviet Union